The Test is an American conflict resolution talk show that premiered on September 9, 2013, and aired on syndication. Hosted by Kirk Fox, The Test handles a variety of tests such as polygraph, DNA, and pregnancy. It resolves conflicts that are present between families, friends or various people.

Production
The series was revealed on January 9, 2013, when it was sold into 56% of the country. By April 2013, The Test was sold in over 90% of the country with Tribune Broadcasting's 17 owned stations serving as the series' anchor group in major markets.

On April 1, 2014, it was announced that The Test had been canceled.

References

External links

2010s American television talk shows
2013 American television series debuts
2014 American television series endings
English-language television shows
First-run syndicated television programs in the United States
Television series by CBS Studios